The Barnham Broom Championship was a women's professional golf tournament on the Ladies European Tour held in England. It was held in October 1980 at Barnham Broom Hotel & Country Club, in Barnham Broom near Norwich, Norfolk. A second tournament was planned for September 1981, but the host venue withdrew their support.

The tournament was won by Muriel Thomson with a score of 230 (eight-over par), four strokes clear of runner-up Maxine Burton.

Winners

Source:

References

External links
Ladies European Tour

Former Ladies European Tour events
Golf tournaments in England
Defunct sports competitions in England